Elsa Patricia Galarza Contreras (b. 12 August 1963) is a Peruvian economist. She had been the Minister of the Environment from 28 July 2016 to 2 April 2018.

Biography
Galarza holds a bachelor's degree in economics from the University of the Pacific in Lima and a master's degree, also in economics, from Iowa State University. She was the Deputy Ministry of Fisheries within the Peruvian Ministry of Production during the second term of Alan García as President of Peru, adviser to the ministerial office of the Ministry of Economy and Finance, and a member of the Multisectorial Group charged with the creation of the Ministry of Environment. She has also been a consultant for the World Bank, the Inter-American Development Bank, the Food and Agriculture Organization of the United Nations, and the Development Bank of Latin America, among others.

As a teacher, Galarza has been a professor at the Academic Department of Economics for the University of the Pacific in Lima and the director of the same university's economics research center.

Minister of Environment
On 15 July 2016, President Pedro Pablo Kuczynski appointed Galarzaas the Minister of Environment, making her the first woman to hold the position.

Citations

1963 births
Living people
University of the Pacific (Peru) alumni
Peruvian Ministers of the Environment
20th-century Peruvian economists
Peruvian women economists
People from Lima Region
21st-century Peruvian economists